Meyer (1908–1931), Irving (1904–1931) and William Shapiro (1911–1934), collectively known as the Shapiro Brothers were the leaders of a group of Jewish-American mobsters from New York City and based in Williamsburg. Well established in the local garment industry, long dominated by Jacob "Gurrah" Shapiro and Louis "Lepke" Buchalter since the 1927 death of Jacob "Little Augie" Orgen, the two began to move against them in the summer of 1931. As the two sides battled for the garment industry in Brooklyn, Irving and Meyer Shapiro were killed by Joseph and Louis Amberg; Irving was gunned down near his apartment on July 11, and Meyer was found shot to death in the basement of a tenement building on Manhattan's Lower East Side on September 17, 1931. Three years later, on orders from Buchalter, Willie Shapiro was finally killed by Murder, Inc. members Martin "Bugsy" Goldstein and Abe "Kid Twist" Reles, supposedly being buried alive in a sandpit in the marshland of Canarsie by Reles, the Amberg brothers, and Frank Abbandando and Harry Maione on the night of July 20, 1934.

Reles would implicate Buchalter in the murders during talks with District Attorney William O'Dwyer after agreeing to become a government informant in 1941. His later testimony would result in the conviction of Buchalter and the rest of Murder, Inc., who were all eventually sentenced to death.

References
Sifakis, Carl. The Encyclopedia of American Crime: Second Edition Vol. II (K–Z). New York: Facts On File Inc., 2001.

Further reading
Downey, Patrick. Gangster City: The History of the New York Underworld 1900–1935, Barricade Books 2004, 2009

External links

Murdered Jewish American gangsters
People murdered by Murder, Inc.

Deaths by firearm in Manhattan
Premature burials
People murdered in New York City
Male murder victims
20th-century American Jews